The 2019 Football Queensland season was the seventh season since NPL Queensland commenced as the top tier of Queensland men’s football. This season was also the second season of the Football Queensland Premier League which occupied the second tier in Queensland men’s football in 2019.

Below NPL Queensland and the FQPL was a regional structure of ten zones with their own leagues. The strongest of the zones was Football Brisbane with its senior men’s competition consisting of four divisions.

The NPL Queensland premiers qualified for the National Premier Leagues finals series, competing with the other state federation champions in a final knockout tournament to decide the National Premier Leagues Champion for 2019.

Men's League Tables

2019 National Premier League Queensland

The National Premier League Queensland 2019 season was played over 28 matches, followed by a finals series.

Finals

2019 Football Queensland Premier League

The 2019 Football Queensland Premier League was the second edition of the Football Queensland Premier League and is the second level domestic association football competition in Queensland.

Finals

2019 Brisbane Premier League

The 2019 Brisbane Premier League was the 37th edition of the Brisbane Premier League which was the third level domestic association football competition in Queensland in 2019.

Finals

2019 Capital League 1

The 2019 Capital League 1 season was the seventh edition of Capital League 1 which was the fourth level domestic association football competition in Queensland in 2019. 12 teams competed, all playing each other twice for a total of 22 matches.

Finals

2019 Capital League 2

The 2019 Capital League 2 season was the seventh edition of Capital League 2 which was the fifth level domestic association football competition in Queensland in 2019. 12 teams competed, all playing each other twice for a total of 22 matches.

Finals

2019 Capital League 3

The 2019 Capital League 3 season was the seventh edition of Capital League 3 which was the sixth level domestic association football competition in Queensland in 2019. 11 teams competed, all playing each other twice for a total of 20 matches.

Finals

Women's League Tables

2019 Women's NPL Queensland

The 2019 Women's NPL Queensland season was the fifth edition of the Women's NPL Queensland as the top level domestic football of women's competition in Queensland. 13 teams competed, all playing each other twice for a total of 24 matches.

Finals
{{4TeamBracket
| RD1         = Semi-finals
| RD2         = Grand Final
| group1      = 
| group2      = 
| seed-width  = 
| team-width  = 
| score-width =

| RD1-seed1  = 1
| RD1-team1  = Lions FC
| RD1-score1 = | RD1-seed2  = 4
| RD1-team2  = Gold Coast United
| RD1-score2 = 1 (2)

| RD1-seed3  = 2
| RD1-team3  = Moreton Bay United| RD1-score3 = 2| RD1-seed4  = 3
| RD1-team4  = The Gap
| RD1-score4 = 1

| RD2-seed1  = 1
| RD2-team1  = Lions FC| RD2-score1 = 3| RD2-seed2  = 2
| RD2-team2  = Moreton Bay United
| RD2-score2 = 1
}}

2019 Brisbane Women’s Premier League

The 2019 Brisbane Women’s Premier League was the second level domestic association football competition in Queensland in 2019. It was expanded this season to include four teams from the Gold Coast (Broadbeach United, Robina City, Southport and Coomera) to make  up a 12 team competition.

Finals

Cup Competitions

2019 Canale Cup

Brisbane-based soccer clubs competed in 2019 for the Canale Cup''', known for sponsorship reasons as the 2019 Pig 'N' Whistle Canale Cup. Clubs entered from the Brisbane Premier League, the Capital League 1, Capital League 2 and Capital League 3.

This knockout competition was won by Grange Thistle.

FFA Cup Qualifiers

Queensland-based soccer clubs competed in 2019 in the preliminary rounds for the 2019 FFA Cup. The four winners of Seventh Round qualified for the final rounds of the FFA Cup; Magpies Crusaders United representing Central and North Queensland, with Brisbane Strikers, Coomera Colts and Olympic FC representing South East Queensland. In addition, A-League club Brisbane Roar qualified for the final rounds, entering at the Round of 32.

2019 City League Cup
This knockout competition was won by the Capalaba Bulldogs City League 1 team.

References

2019 in Australian soccer
Football Queensland seasons